Moray is an archaeological site in Peru approximately  northwest of Cuzco on a high plateau at about  and just west of the village of Maras. As with many other Inca sites, it also has an irrigation system.

The purpose of these depressions is uncertain, but their depth, design, and orientation with respect to wind and sun creates a temperature difference of as much as 5 °C (9 °F) between the top and the bottom.

Erosion threats to structure
During the rainy season of 2009–2010, the Department of Cusco received high levels of precipitation that are atypical, which caused permanent damage to the ruins of Moray. The terraced levels of the complex, which are constructed from stone and compacted earth, were damaged extensively as the excessive rain waters undermined the ground beneath the structure.

The eastern side of the principal circle collapsed during February 2010, causing concerns about the permanence of the site as a top tourist attraction in Peru. A temporary wooden support structure was erected to prevent further collapse until reconstruction work could begin.

According to travel writer Paul Jones, "Although repair work at Moray continues to restore the site to its original state, lack of funds and continuing annual rainfall hinder progress. This interesting archaeological site which forms an important part of tourism to the region continues to be at risk of further degradation, should the repair work not be completed and maintained for the future years."

Origin
This landmark is widely agreed to have been used for farming, and soil samples have shown that soils were brought in from different regions to be used in helping grow crops at the different levels of the terraces. The wide temperature differences in the terraces have created micro climates, similar to what is achieved in greenhouses in modern times.
The landmark also looks similar to an open pit mine. After the mining was done, the Incas could have reinforced the walls to prevent landslides, and started to grow crops on the terraces.

See also
 Vertical archipelago

References

External links 
 

Archaeological sites in Peru
Archaeological sites in Cusco Region